Ayberk Olmaz (born June 8, 1996) is a Turkish professional basketball player for Merkezefendi Bld. Denizli Basket of the Turkish Basketball Super League (BSL).

Professional career
In 2013, Olmaz signed a contract with Fenerbahçe Ülker. On October 5, 2013, in pre-season game against the Oklahoma City Thunder he had 1 assist, 3 rebounds performance in 6 minutes.

Before the beginning of the 2014-2015 season, he was loaned to TED Ankara Kolejliler for 3 years.

On July 26, 2018, he has signed with Galatasaray of the Turkish Basketbol Süper Ligi (BSL).

On August 2, 2021, he has signed with Afyon Belediye of the Turkish Basketbol Süper Ligi (BSL).

On December 9, 2021, he has signed with Frutti Extra Bursaspor of Basketball Super League (BSL).

On August 1, 2022, he has signed with Merkezefendi Bld. Denizli Basket of the Turkish Basketball Super League (BSL).

References

External links
 TBLStat.net Profile
 euroleague.net Profile
 eurobasket.com Profile
 FIBA Profile
 realgm.com Profile
 

1996 births
Living people
Afyonkarahisar Belediyespor players
Bursaspor Basketbol players
Centers (basketball)
Fenerbahçe men's basketball players
Galatasaray S.K. (men's basketball) players
İstanbul Büyükşehir Belediyespor basketball players
Merkezefendi Belediyesi Denizli Basket players
TED Ankara Kolejliler players
Turkish men's basketball players